Estadio Nelson Barrera Romellón is a stadium in Campeche, Mexico.  It is primarily used for baseball, and is the home field of the Piratas de Campeche (Campeche Pirates) Mexican League baseball team.  It holds 6,000 people.  It is named for Campeche native and Mexican League home run and RBI record setter Nelson Barrera.  It was built in the same location as the former Estadio Venustiano Carranza (originally built 28 December 1958), which had served as the home field for the Pirates from 1980 through 1997.  For the 1998 through the 2000 seasons the Pirates played out of the 3,000 seat Estadio Leandro Dominguez in the Santa Lucia neighborhood of the city of Campeche. Estadio Nelson Barrera Romellón was opened on 22 May 2001 with a victory of the Pirates over the visiting Olmecas de Tabasco.

References 

Baseball venues in Mexico
Mexican League ballparks
Sports venues completed in 2001
Sports venues in Campeche
Campeche City
2001 establishments in Mexico